The 1948 Detroit Titans football team represented the University of Detroit as an independent during the 1948 college football season. Detroit outscored its opponents by a combined total of 209 to 112 and finished with a 6–3 record in its fourth year under head coach Chuck Baer.

Schedule

See also
 1948 in Michigan

References

External links
 1948 University of Detroit football programs

Detroit
Detroit Titans football seasons
Detroit Titans football
Detroit Titans football